Sir Adrian Scrope or Scroope (c. 1616–1666) of Cockerington, Lincolnshire was an English politician who sat in the House of Commons from 1661 to 1666. He was a Royalist officer in the English Civil War.

Biography
Scrope was the son of Sir Gervase Scrope of Cockerington and his first wife Catherine Hungerford, daughter of John Hungerford of Chisbury, Wiltshire. He was educated at Westminster School and was admitted at St John's College, Cambridge on 18 May 1632, aged 16. He entered Lincoln's Inn in 1634. At the start of the civil war his father raised a regiment for King Charles I, and was left for dead at Edgehill, where he received sixteen wounds, but survived to 1655.

Adrian Scrope was a Gentleman of the privy chamber from 1641 to 1646. He served in the king's army as a Colonel of horse during the civil war from 1642 to 1646. The fine imposed on father and son for their delinquency amounted to over £6,000.  

After the Restoration of the Monarchy he was  made Knight of the Bath on 23 April 1661 at the coronation of Charles II. In 1661, he was elected Member of Parliament for Great Grimsby in the Cavalier Parliament. He served as captain in the Earl of Cleveland's Horse from 1662 to his death.

He died in 1666.

Family
Scrope married Mary Carr, daughter of Sir Robert Carr, 2nd Baronet of Sleaford, and was the father of Sir Carr Scrope.

Notes

References
Attribution

1610s births
1666 deaths
People educated at Westminster School, London
Alumni of St John's College, Cambridge
Members of Lincoln's Inn
English army officers
Cavaliers
Knights of the Bath
English MPs 1661–1679
Gentlemen of the Privy Chamber
Members of the Parliament of England for Great Grimsby